The surname Cox is of English or Welsh origin, and may have originated independently in several places in Great Britain, with the variations arriving at a standard spelling only later. There are also two native Scottish & Irish surnames which were anglicised into Cox.

An early record of the surname dates from 1556 with the marriage of Alicea Cox at St. Martin in the Fields, Westminster, London. Cox is the 69th-most common surname in the United Kingdom.

Origin
One possibility of the origin is that it is a version of the Old English  which means "the little", and was sometimes put after the name of a leader or chieftain as a term of endearment.  Surnames such as Wilcox, Willcocks and Willcox are examples of this practice: all are composed of the name William and the archaic word , coming together to mean "little William".  The suggestion is that only the element -cox may have endured as a surname for some families.

Another opinion is that the name is derived from the Old English , which means a "heap" or "mound", and was a topographic name for a man living near any heap, hill or other bundle.  Names like Haycock or Haycox come from such practice, meaning from "the hay mounds" or "the hay fields".  Again, the element -cox may have only been carried on in some families.

The third possibility is that it comes from the Welsh , meaning "red".  In this opinion, the word could have either been applied to a man with red hair, calling him in essence "the Red", or else served as a topographic name for someone living near the ruddy-hued hills found in Wales, implying that the man is "from the red hills".  In Cornwall, the surnames Cock and Couch (pronounced 'cooch') also derive from Cornish  "red, scarlet".

In these cases, the surname is likely to derive from occupation.

The English word "cock", meaning "rooster", is derived from the Anglo-Saxon word , and a fourth possibility is that the surname came about as a nickname.

Another possibility is that the name is of Norman origin. In the Battle of Hastings in October 1066, Alric Le Coq was one of Duke William's companions. Alric was said to have been a "a strutting {as a rooster struts} Norman soldier ... who was nicknamed '' and his children 'little cockes.'"  could easily have been Anglicized to Cox as seen in the previous possibility.

The surname Cox is also native to Belgian and Dutch Limburg.

Noticeably similar surnames include Cock, Cocks, Coxe, Coxen and Coxon.  There is no evidence beyond similar spellings and phonetics that these surnames are related.  Given that the origins of the Cox surname are uncertain, it is possible that these names developed as spelling variations, or that each of these names has an origin in a separate word and language.

The origins of the surname in North America are speculated across several written accounts, with most sources pointing toward three distinct families arriving from England in the 17th and 18th Centuries: in 1690, brothers Thomas, William, and Walter Cocke originally of Surry; in 1705, the family of Dr. Wilham Cocke of Williamsburg; and at an unknown time before 1658, Nicholas Cocke of Middlesex.

Notable people with the surname "Cox" include

A
Aaron Cox (born 1965), American football player
Abbie Cox (1902–1985), Canadian ice hockey player
Adam Cox (born 1986), British artistic gymnast
Adrian Cox (born 1980), Australian rules footballer
Aimee Cox, American anthropologist
Ainslee Cox (1936–1988), American conductor
Alan Cox (disambiguation), multiple people
Alaqua Cox (born 1997), American actress
Albert Cox (disambiguation), multiple people
Alexander Cox (disambiguation), multiple people
Alf Cox (1919–2008), Australian rugby league footballer
Alfred Cox (disambiguation), multiple people
Alison Cox (born 1979), American rower
Allyn Cox (1896–1982), American artist
Alphonso Cox (1908–1964), American baseball player
Amanda Cox (born 1980), American journalist
Amber Cox (born 1973/1974), American sports executive
Ana Marie Cox (born 1972), American blogger
André Cox (born 1954), Zimbabwean General of The Salvation Army
Andrew Cox (born 1964), Australian rower
Andy Cox (born 1956), British guitarist
Anna Cox, British neuroscientist
Anthony Cox (disambiguation), multiple people
Archibald Cox (1912–2004), American politician
Arisa Cox (born 1978), Canadian television personality
Arthur Cox (disambiguation), multiple people
Ashley Cox (born 1956), American model and actress

B
Barbara Cox (disambiguation), multiple people
Barry Cox (born 1949), Australian rugby league footballer
Barry Cox (singer), British-Chinese singer
Bell Cox (1826–1897), Irish priest
Ben Cox (born 1992), English cricketer
Benjamin Cox (disambiguation), multiple people
Berkley Cox (born 1935), Australian rules footballer
Bill Cox (disambiguation), multiple people
Billy Cox (born 1941), American bass guitarist
Billy Cox (baseball) (1919–1978), American baseball player
Bobby Cox (disambiguation), multiple people
Brad Cox (disambiguation), multiple people
Bradford Cox (born 1982), American singer-songwriter
Brandon Cox (born 1983), American football player
Brenda Cox (1944–2015), Australian sprinter
Brennan Cox (born 1998), Australian rules footballer
Brenton Cox Jr. (born 2000), American football player
Brian Cox (disambiguation), multiple people
Britteny Cox (born 1994), Australian skier
Bronwyn Cox (born 1997), Australian rower
Bruce Cox (1918–2004), American photographer
Bryan Cox (born 1968), American football player and coach
Bryan Cox Jr. (born 1994), American football player
Bryan-Michael Cox (born 1977), American songwriter
Bud Cox (born 1960), American tennis player

C
Calli Cox (born 1977), American pornographic actress
Canela Cox (born 1984), American singer-songwriter
Carl Cox (born 1962), British musician, club DJ and record producer
Carmiesha Cox (born 1995), Bahamian sprinter
Carol Cox, American drag racer
Caroline Cox (born 1937), English politician
Cary Cox (1917–1991), American football player
Casey Cox (born 1941), American baseball player
Cassidy Cox (born 1998), American archer
Catherine Cox (disambiguation), multiple people
Cathy Cox (disambiguation), multiple people
C. C. Cox (1887–1915), American race car driver
Cedric Cox (1913–1993), Canadian technician and politician
Cedric Cox (footballer) (born 1997), Australian rules footballer
Chandler Cox (born 1996), American football player
Channing H. Cox (1879–1968), American politician
Chapman B. Cox (born 1940), American military advisor
Charles Cox (disambiguation), multiple people
Charly Cox (born 1995), British poet
Cheryl Cox (born 1949), American politician
Chip Cox (born 1983), American football player
Chris Cox (disambiguation), multiple people
Christina Cox (born 1971), Canadian actress
Christopher Cox (disambiguation), multiple people
Chubby Cox (born 1955), American basketball player
Cindy Cox (born 1961), American composer
Claire Cox (born 1975), British actress
Clay Cox (born 1968), American politician
Colin Cox (1922–1989), Australian rules footballer
Comer Cox (1905–1971), American baseball player
Constance Cox (1912–1998), British scriptwriter
Courteney Cox (born 1964), American actress
Courtney Cox (disambiguation), multiple people
Crystal Cox (born 1979), American track and field athlete
Curome Cox (born 1981), American football player

D
Damien Cox (born 1961), Canadian journalist
Daniel Cox (disambiguation), multiple people
Danny Cox (disambiguation), multiple people
Darius Cox (born 1983), Bermudian footballer
Darren Cox (born 1974), British businessman
Darron Cox (born 1967), American baseball player
Darryl Cox (disambiguation), multiple people
Dave Cox (1938–2010), American politician
David Cox (disambiguation), multiple people
Dayna Cox (born 1993), Australian rules footballer
Dean Cox (born 1981), Australian rules footballer
Dean Cox (English footballer) (born 1987), English footballer
Deb Cox (born 1958), Australian screenwriter
Deborah Cox (born 1971), Canadian singer
Demetrious Cox (born 1994), American football player
Denise Cox, American geologist
Dennis Cox (1925–2001), English cricketer
Derek Cox (born 1986), American football player
Derek Cox (athlete) (1931–2008), English athlete
Dick Cox (1897–1966), American baseball player
Doak Cox (1917–2003), American geologist
Doc Cox (born 1946), British television personality
Donald Cox (disambiguation), multiple people
Donna Cox, American professor
Dorinda Cox (born 1977), Australian politician
Dorothy Cox (disambiguation), multiple people
Doug Cox (disambiguation), multiple people
Douglas Cox (disambiguation), multiple people

E
Earnest Cox (disambiguation), multiple people
E. B. Cox (1914–2003), Canadian sculptor
Ed Cox (disambiguation), multiple people
Edgar William Cox (1882–1918), British intelligence officer
Edward Cox (disambiguation), multiple people
Edwin Cox (disambiguation), multiple people
Elbert Frank Cox (1895–1969), American mathematician
Eleanor Worthington Cox (born 2001), British actress
Elijah Albert Cox (1876–1955), British painter
Elijah Allen Cox (1887–1974), American judge
Elizabeth Cox, English actress
Elizabeth Cox (humanitarian), Australian humanitarian
Emily Cox (disambiguation), multiple people
Emma Cox (born 1992), Australian sport shooter
Emmett Ripley Cox (1935–2021), American judge
Eric Cox (1923–2006), Australian rugby league footballer
Erin Nealy Cox (born 1970), American attorney
Erle Cox (1873–1950), Australian writer
Ernest Cox (disambiguation), multiple people
Ernie Cox (1894–1962), Canadian football player
Ernie Cox (baseball) (1894–1974), American baseball player
E. S. Cox (disambiguation), multiple people
Ethan Cox (born 1987), Canadian ice hockey player
Euan Hillhouse Methven Cox (1893–1977), English botanist
Eugene Saint Julien Cox (1834–1898), American politician
Eva Cox (born 1938), Australian writer

F
Fletcher Cox (born 1990), American football player
Frances Elizabeth Cox (1812–1879), English translator
Francis Cox (disambiguation), multiple people
Francisco José Cox (1933–2020), Chilean prelate
Frank Cox (disambiguation), multiple people
Franklin Cox (born 1961), American composer
Freddie Cox (1920–1973), English football player
Frederic Cox (1905–1985), British singer
Frederick Cox (disambiguation), multiple people
Frosty Cox (1908–1962), American basketball coach
F. W. Cox (1817–1904), Australian pastor

G
Gardner Cox (1920–1988), American sailor
Garfield V. Cox (1893–1970), American economist
Gary Cox (disambiguation), multiple people
Gene Cox (1935–2009), American football coach
Geoffrey Cox (disambiguation), multiple people
George Cox (disambiguation), multiple people
Geraldine Cox (born 1945), Australian orphanage administrator
Gerard Cox (born 1940), Dutch singer
Gershom Cox (1863–1918), English footballer
Gertrude Mary Cox (1900–1978), American statistician
Gilbert Cox (1908–1974), English cricketer
Glenn Cox (1931–2012), American baseball player
Grace Victoria Cox (born 1995), Australian actress
Graham Cox (disambiguation), multiple people
Greg Cox (disambiguation), multiple people
Guillermo Larco Cox (1932–2002), Peruvian politician
Gustavus Cox (1870–1958), Barbadian cricketer

H
Hampden Cox (1886–1940), Barbadian cricketer
Han Cox (1899–1979), Dutch rower
Hardin Cox (1928–2013), American politician
Harold Cox (disambiguation), multiple people
Harry Cox (disambiguation), multiple people
Harvey Cox (born 1929), American theologian
Hayden Cox (born 1982), Australian entrepreneur
Heather Cox (born 1970), American sportscaster
Herbert Charles Fahie Cox (1893–1973), British lawyer
Henry Cox (disambiguation), multiple people
Hiram Cox (1760–1799), British diplomat
Homersham Cox (disambiguation), multiple people
Horace Cox, English publisher
Howard Cox, British academic
H. R. Cox (1907–1986), American bacteriologist
Hudson B. Cox, American lawyer

I
Ian Cox (born 1971), Trinidadian footballer
Ian Cox (cricketer) (born 1967), English cricketer
Ida Cox (1896–1967), American musician
Idris Cox (1899–1989), Welsh community activist
Ingemar Cox, English professor
Irwin Cox (1838–1922), British barrister
Isaac Cox (disambiguation), multiple people

J
Jabril Cox (born 1998), American football player
Jacob Cox (1810–1892), American painter
Jacob Dolson Cox (1828–1900), American soldier and politician
Jack Cox (disambiguation), multiple people
Jackie Cox (disambiguation), multiple people
Jamael Cox (born 1992), American soccer player
James Cox (disambiguation), multiple people
Jamie Cox (born 1969), Australian cricketer
Jamie Cox (boxer) (born 1986), British boxer
Jan Cox (disambiguation), multiple people
Janae Cox (born 1985), American gymnast
Jane Cox (born 1952), American actress
J. B. Cox (born 1984), American baseball player
J'den Cox (born 1995), American wrestler
Jean Cox (1922–2012), American tenor
Jeff Cox (disambiguation), multiple people
Jennifer Elise Cox (born 1969), American actress
Jennings Cox, American mining engineer
Jeremy Cox (born 1996), American football player
Jeromy Cox (born 1970), American colorist
Jesse Cox (disambiguation), multiple people
Jessica Cox (born 1983), American pilot
Jim Cox (disambiguation), multiple people
Jimmy Cox (1882–1925), American vaudeville performer
Jo Cox (disambiguation), multiple people
Joanna Cox, British mariner
Joel Cox (born 1942), American film editor
John Cox (disambiguation), multiple people
Johnny Cox (born 1936), American basketball player
Jolan Cox (born 1991), Belgian volleyball player
Jon Cox (born 1986), American soccer player
Jordan Cox (disambiguation), multiple people
Joseph Cox (disambiguation), multiple people
Josephine Cox (1938–2020), English author
Josh Cox (born 1975), American runner
Julian Cox (??–1663), English witch
Julie Cox (born 1973), Scottish actress
Justin R. Cox (born 1981), American soccer player

K
Kadeena Cox (born 1991), British athlete
Karen L. Cox, American historian
Karl Cox, American business executive
Katelyn Cox (born 1998), Australian rules footballer
Katelynne Cox (born 1994), American singer
Katherine Laird Cox (1887–1938), British socialist
Kathleen Cox (1904–1972), Irish artist
Kathy Cox (disambiguation), multiple people
Keith Cox (1933–1998), British geologist
Keith Cox (cricketer) (1903–1977), New Zealand cricketer
Kennard Cox (born 1985), American football player
Kenneth A. Cox (1916–2011), American attorney
Kenny Cox (1940–2008), American pianist
Kenyon Cox (1856–1919), American artist
Kerrianne Cox, Australian singer
Kevin R. Cox (born 1939), British-American geographer
Kirk Cox (born 1957), American politician
Kris Cox (born 1973), American golfer
Kristen Cox (born 1969), American politician
Kristy Cox, Australian singer-songwriter
Kurt Cox (1947–2018), American golfer

L
Lance Cox (1933–2016), Australian rules footballer
Lara Cox (born 1978), Australian actress
Larry Cox (disambiguation), multiple people
Laura Cox (disambiguation), multiple people
Lauren Cox (born 1998), American basketball player
Lauren Cox (swimmer) (born 2001), English swimmer
Laurence Cox (disambiguation), multiple people
Laurie D. Cox (1883–1968), American landscape architect
Laverne Cox (born 1972), American actress
LaWanda Cox (1909–2005), American historian
Leander Cox (1812–1865), American politician
Lee Cox (disambiguation), multiple people
Leonard Cox (1495–1549), English author
Leonard Bell Cox (1894–1976), Australian neurologist
Leroy M. Cox (1906–1981), American entrepreneur
Les Cox (1904–1934), American baseball player
Leslie Reginald Cox (1897–1965), British malacologist
Lionel Cox (disambiguation), multiple people
Louis Cox (1874–1961), American judge
Louise Cox (disambiguation), multiple people
Lucy Cox (artist) (born 1988), British artist
Lynne Cox (born 1957), American swimmer

M
Maarten Cox (born 1985), Belgian singer
Madison Cox (born 1995), Puerto Rican footballer
Madisyn Cox (born 1995), American swimmer
Margaret Cox (disambiguation), multiple people
Margie Cox, American singer
Marian Roalfe Cox (1860–1916), English folklorist
Marie C. Cox (1920–2005), American activist
Marion Cox (1920–1996), NASCAR owner
Mark Cox (disambiguation), multiple people
Marsha Cox (born 1983), South African field hockey player
Marta Cox (born 1997), Panamanian footballer
Martin Cox (born 1956), American football player
Martyn Cox, English politician
Marvyn Cox (born 1964), German race car driver
Mason Cox (born 1991), American Australian rules footballer
Matthew Cox (disambiguation), multiple people
Maurice Cox (born 1959), English footballer
Meghan Cox (born 1994), American soccer player
Mekia Cox (born 1981), American actress
Mia Cox, American singer-songwriter
Michael Cox (disambiguation), multiple people
Michele Cox (born 1968), New Zealand footballer
Michelle Cox (born 1991), Australian softball player
Mike Cox (disambiguation), multiple people
Minnie M. Cox (1869–1933), American teacher
Molly Cox (1925–1991), British television producer
Monica Cox, American professor
Montana Cox (born 1993), Australian model
Morgan Cox (born 1986), American football player

N
Nagin Cox (born 1965), Indian aeronautical engineer
Nancy Cox (disambiguation), multiple people
Nathalie Cox, British actress
Nathan Cox (born 1971), American music video director
Neil Cox (born 1971), English footballer
Newman Cox (1867–1938), Guyanese cricketer
Nicholas Cox (disambiguation), multiple people
Nico Cox, American horologist
Nigel Cox (disambiguation), multiple people
Nikki Cox (born 1978), American actress
Noel Cox (born 1965), New Zealand lawyer
Noel Cox (politician) (1911–1985), American politician
Norman Cox (disambiguation), multiple people

O
Oliver Cox (1901–1974), Trinidadian-American sociologist
Oscar Cox (1880–1931), Brazilian sportsman
Oscar Cox (lawyer) (1905–1966), American lawyer and judge
Owen Cox (1866–1932), Welsh-Australian businessman
Owen DeVol Cox (1910–1990), American judge

P
Paige Cox (1855–1934), British archdeacon
Palmer Cox (1840–1924), Canadian inventor
Pat Cox (born 1952), Irish politician
Patrick Cox (born 1963), Canadian-British fashion designer
Patrick L. Cox, American historian
Paul Cox (disambiguation), multiple people
Paula Cox (born 1964), Bermudian politician
Percy Cox (1864–1937), British diplomat
Percy Cox (cricketer) (1878–1918), Barbadian cricketer
Percy S. Cox (1872–1911), American photographer
Perrish Cox (born 1987), American football player
Perry D. Cox (born 1957), American memorabilia expert
Peter Cox (disambiguation), multiple people
Phil Cox (born 1974), American political operative
Philip Cox (born 1939), Australian architect
Philip Cox (businessman) (born 1951), British businessman
Philip Joseph Cox (1922–2014), British naval officer
Pierre Cox (born 1956), French astronomer

R
Rachael Cox (born 1975), Australian Paralympic sailor
Rachel Cox (disambiguation), multiple people
Rakim Cox (born 1991), American football player
Ralph Cox (born 1957), American ice hockey player
Ramsay Cox (1911–2005), English cricketer
Raphael Cox (born 1986), American soccer player
Rawle Cox (born 1960), American field hockey player
Ray Cox (disambiguation), multiple people
Raymond Cox (1951–2017), American businessman and politician
Rebecca Cox (disambiguation), multiple people
Red Cox (1895–1984), American baseball player
Reginald Cox (1865–1922), English banker
Renard Cox (born 1978), American football player
Renee Cox (born 1960), American artist
Richard Cox (disambiguation), multiple people
Robert Cox (disambiguation), multiple people
Roderick Cox (disambiguation), multiple people
Roger Cox (born 1947), English cricketer
Rohanee Cox (born 1980), Australian basketball player
Rónadh Cox (born 1962), Irish geologist
Ronald Cox (disambiguation), multiple people
Roosevelt Cox (1914–??), American baseball player
Rory Cox (born 1991), English cricketer
Roxbee Cox (1902–1997), British aeronautical engineer
Rupert Cox (born 1967), English cricketer
Russell Cox (born 1951), Australian rugby league footballer
Russell M. Cox (1919–1942), American naval officer
Ryan Cox (1979–2007), South African cyclist

S
Sabian Cox (born 1991), Trinidadian sprinter
Sammy Cox (1924–2015), Scottish footballer
Samuel Cox (disambiguation), multiple people
Sara Cox (disambiguation), multiple people
Sarah Cox, British civil servant
Schaeffer Cox (born 1984), American political activist and felon
Scott William Cox (born 1963), American serial killer
Sean Cox (born 1963), American judge
Sean Cox (rugby union) (born 1985), English rugby union footballer
Shana Cox (born 1985), American track and field athlete
Shannon Cox (born 1986), Australian rules footballer
Shawn Cox (born 1974), Barbadian boxer
Sidney E. Cox (1887–1975), English-Canadian religious figure
Simon Cox (disambiguation), multiple people
Somers Cox (1911–1997), New Zealand rower
Sonia Cox (1936–2001), New Zealand tennis and badminton player
Sonny Cox (basketball) (1938–2020), American basketball coach
Sonny Cox (footballer) (born 2004), English footballer
Sophie Cox (born 1981), British judoka
Spencer Cox (disambiguation), multiple people
Stanley Cox (disambiguation), multiple people
Stephen Cox (disambiguation), multiple people
Stephanie Cox (born 1986), American soccer player
Steve Cox (disambiguation), multiple people
Susan Cox (disambiguation), multiple people
Susanna Cox (1785–1809), American domestic servant
Suzanne Cox (born 1972), English aerobic instructor
Sydney Cox, English cricketer

T
Tara Cox (born 1971), New Zealand footballer
Ted Cox (disambiguation), multiple people
TJ Cox (born 1963), American engineer and politician
Terry Cox (born 1937), English drummer
Terry Cox (baseball) (born 1949), American baseball player
Theodolphus Cox (1855–1908), New Zealand cricketer
Thomas Cox (disambiguation), multiple people
Tiequon Cox (born 1965), American murderer
Tim Cox, American TV director
Timothy Cox (baseball) (born 1986), Australian baseball player
Tomás Cox (born 1950), Chilean journalist
Tony Cox (disambiguation), multiple people
Torrie Cox (born 1980), American football player
Trena Cox (1895–1980), English artist
Trenchard Cox (1905–1995), British museum director
Trevor Cox, English academic
Trevor Cox (ice hockey) (born 1995), Canadian ice hockey player
Tricia Nixon Cox (born 1946), American daughter of Richard Nixon

V
Vaughan Cox (1860–1923), British general
Vivienne Cox (born 1959), British businesswoman
V. L. Cox (born 1962), American artist

W
Wally Cox (1924–1973), American actor
Walter Cox (disambiguation), multiple people
Warren J. Cox (born 1935), American architect
Wendell Cox, American public policy consultant
Wesley Cox (born 1955), American basketball player
West Cox (born 1986), American politician
W. F. Cox, American football player
W. H. Lionel Cox (1844–1921), British lawyer and judge
Wiffy Cox (1896–1969), American golfer
William Cox (disambiguation), multiple people

Z
Zack Cox (born 1989), American baseball player

Fictional characters
Julianna Cox, fictional character from Homicide: Life on the Street
Perry Cox, fictional character on the TV series Scrubs
Reg Cox, fictional character in East Enders soap opera

See also
Cocks (surname), people surnamed Cocks
Cockx, people surnamed Cockx
Cox (disambiguation), a disambiguation page
Coxe, people surnamed Coxe
Kox, people surnamed Kox
General Cox (disambiguation), a disambiguation page with Generals surnamed Cox
Governor Cox (disambiguation), a disambiguation page with Governors surnamed Cox
Justice Cox (disambiguation), a disambiguation page with Justices surnamed Cox
Senator Cox (disambiguation), a disambiguation page with Senators surnamed Cox

Sources
 Cottle, Basil. Penguin Dictionary of Surnames. Baltimore: Penguin Books, 1967.
 Hanks, Patrick. Dictionary of American Family Names. Oxford University Press, 2003.
 Hanks, Patrick and Flavia Hodges. A Dictionary of Surnames. Oxford University Press, 1989.
 Smith, Elsdon C. American Surnames. Genealogical Publishing Company, 1997.

References

Welsh-language surnames
Cornish-language surnames
English-language surnames
Surnames of English origin
Surnames of Welsh origin
English toponymic surnames